Jonack is an Assamese language general entertainment television channel owned by Brahmaputra Tele Productions Pvt. Ltd.
of Guwahati, Assam. It is a sister channel of Assamese news channel DY365.

Currently broadcast

Comedy series 

Gogoi nogor

Drama series

Former broadcasts

Comedy series

Drama series

External links
Official Site of JONACK

See also
 DY365
List of Assamese-language television channels

Assamese-language mass media
Assamese-language television channels
Television channels and stations established in 2009
Television stations in Guwahati